The Edinburgh Academical Football Club, also known as Edinburgh Accies, is a rugby union club in Edinburgh, Scotland. The club is currently a member of the Scottish Premiership, the top tier of Scottish club rugby. Its home ground is Raeburn Place, in Stockbridge, Edinburgh. The team is coached by Iain Berthinussen.

The club regularly fields three teams and is also involved with Broughton and Trinity Accies in the Edinburgh BATs initiative, a community amateur sports club providing youth rugby across northern Edinburgh.

History 

The club was formed in 1857 and is the oldest surviving football club of any code in Scotland,  and the second oldest rugby union club in continuous existence in the world, behind Dublin University Football Club (founded 1854). They were one of the founding members of the Scottish Rugby Union.

In the 1873–74 season, they played ten matches, and won all of them.

In season 2007–08, the club's 1st XV finished second in Premiership Division 2, thereby securing promotion to the Premiership Division 1. That same season they experienced a successful Scottish Cup run, reaching the final with victories over Premiership 1 teams Currie, Hawick and Boroughmuir. The team lost the final 24–13 to the Glasgow Hawks. The club played a match against the Barbarians in April 2008 to mark the club's 150th anniversary. A book was also published that had been commissioned to celebrate the club's 150th anniversary, The Accies: The Cradle of Scottish Rugby.

In season 2009–10 the club's 1st XV was relegated to Scottish Premier Division 2 after they lost to Heriot's FP in the last game of the season and on the same day Watsonian's beat Melrose.

In season 2010–11 the club were Premier 2 League champions and returned to the top level of Scottish club rugby, the Premier 1 League, for the 2011–12 season. They remained in the Scottish Premiership after the restructure of the Scottish league system.

Ground

The Accies' home ground, Raeburn Place, is the location of the first rugby international. Seven players of the original Scotland side were Academicals, including the captain, FJ Moncrieff.

Honours

Men
 Scottish Unofficial Championship
 Champions (16 + 4 shared): 1865–66, 1866–67, 1867–68, 1868–69, 1870–71, 1874–75, 1876–77 (with Glasgow Academicals), 1877–78, 1878–79 (with Glasgow Academicals), 1879–80 (with Glasgow Academicals), 1885–86, 1886–87, 1887–88, 1897–98, 1898–99, 1899–1900 (with Edinburgh University and Hawick), 1905–06, 1929–30, 1955–56
 Scottish National League Division One
 Champions (3): 1996–97, 2010–11, 2017–18
 Runners–Up (2): 2007–08, 2016–17
 Scottish National League Division Two
 Champions (2): 1999–00, 2003–04
 Scottish Cup
 Runners–Up (1): 2006–07
 Langholm Sevens
 Champions (1): 1929
 Melrose Sevens
 Champions (3): 1928, 1930, 1949
 Hawick Sevens
 Champions (3): 1929, 1936, 1946 (jointly fielded team with Edinburgh Wanderers)
 Gala Sevens
 Champions (1): 2019
 Peebles Sevens
 Champions (3): 1947 (jointly fielded team with Edinburgh Wanderers), 1984, 1989
 Edinburgh Charity Sevens
 Champions (5): 1929, 1932, 1933, 1942 (jointly fielded team with Edinburgh Wanderers), 1945 (jointly fielded team with Edinburgh Wanderers)
 Highland Sevens
 Champions (9): 1933, 1934, 1935, 1936, 1937, 1938, 1954, 1970, 1998
 Edinburgh Borderers Sevens
 Champions (1): 1966
 Broughton Sevens
 Champions (1): 2007
 Lismore Sevens
 Champions (4): 1975, 1982, 1986, 1991
 Haddington Sevens
 Champions (1): 1989
 Edinburgh Northern Sevens
 Champions (1): 2015
 Musselburgh Sevens
 Champions (2): 1979, 1992

Women
 Mull Sevens
 Champions (4): 1992, 1994, 1996, 1997

Notable players

British and Irish Lions
The following former Edinburgh Academical players have represented the British and Irish Lions.

  Rodger Arneil
  Mike Blair
  Alf Bucher
  Stan Coughtrie
  Jimmy Gillespie
  Scott Murray
  Robert Miln Neill
  David Sole
  Rob Wainwright

Scotland internationalists
The following (not previously listed above) former Edinburgh Academical players have represented Scotland at full international level in rugby union.

  John Allan
  Lewis Bell
  David Callam
  Alexander Clay
  Jack Crabbie
  George Crabbie
  David Denton
  Francis Dods
  John Dods
  Cornell du Preez
  Douglas Elliot
  Arthur Finlay
  James Finlay
  Ninian Finlay
  George Gallie
  John Gordon
  Ian Graham
  Gussie Graham
  Chris Gray
  Ian Henderson
  Mac Henderson
  Hamish Inglis
  Bulldog Irvine
  Duncan Irvine
  Thomas Irvine
  William Lyall
  Donnie Macfadyen
  John Macphail
  George Macleod
  Arthur Marshall
  William Marshall
  Hugh Martin
  George Maxwell
  Tommy McClung
  John McCrow
  Bill McEwan
  Saxon McEwan
  Dave McIvor
  James Mein
  Stuart Moffat
  Alec Moore
  William Morrison
  Scott Murray
  Brian Neill
  George Paterson
  Tom Philip
  Charles Reid
  James Reid
  Jeremy Richardson
 
  Duncan Robertson
  Ernest Roland
  Graham Ross
  William Roughead
  James Sanderson
  Jock Scott
  Hamish Shaw
  Allen Sloan
  Donald Sloan
  Pat Smeaton
  Errol Smith
  Archibald Stewart
  Barry Stewart
  Jock Stewart
  John Guthrie Tait
  Thomas Torrie
  Phipps Turnbull
  Alexander Watt
  Tom White
  Francis Wright
  Arthur Young

Other internationalists

The following former Edinburgh Academical players have represented their nations at full international level.
  Bill McEwan
  Alastair Reed

Cross-Sporting internationalists

Cricket
The following former Edinburgh Academical players have represented both the Scotland rugby union team and the Scotland cricket team.

  Leslie Balfour-Melville 
  Edward Bannerman
  Bill Maclagan
  Kenneth Marshall
  Thomas Marshall
  Henry Stevenson
  Ben Tod

Rugby league
The following have represented Scotland at full international level.
  P. J. Solomon

References
 Bath, Richard (ed.) The Complete Book of Rugby (Seven Oaks Ltd, 1997 )
 Massie, Allan A Portrait of Scottish Rugby (Polygon, Edinburgh)

External links
 
 'The Accies - The Cradle of Scottish Rugby' - Club history written by David Barnes

Rugby clubs established in 1857
Scottish rugby union teams
Rugby union in Edinburgh
1857 establishments in Scotland
Sports teams in Edinburgh